Herbert  "Hebbi" Guðmundsson (born 15 December 1953) is an Icelandic pop music singer-songwriter. He is best known for his songs "Svaraðu", "Time", "Hollywood" and "Can‘t Walk Away", which reached No. 1 on the Icelandic listings chart in 1985.

Life and career
Herbert Guðmundsson first became widely known in Iceland when offered to sing with the band Tilvera in 1971, which was one of the most popular bands in Iceland at the time along with Trúbrot and Ævintýri. Herbert took part in the first staging of Jesus Christ Superstar in Iceland in 1972, and soon after the staging of Faust at the National Theater of Iceland and fronted various Icelandic bands, including Elífð, Tilvera, Stofnþel, Eik, Pelican, Dínamít and the band Kan.

Guðmundsson released his debut album Á ströndinni in 1977 with the band Eik. Although he released his first album then, it has been stated that his career officially started in 1965 when he was only 12 years old in a school band. The band Kan recorded the album Í Ræktinni with Herbert including the songs "Megi sá draumur" and "Vestfjarðaróður" in 1984.

In 1985 Herbert embarked upon a solo career with his third album Dawn of the Human Revolution. He released the first single "Can't Walk Away", which instantly became a major hit in Iceland and topped the charts for a couple of weeks.

Discography

Studio albums
 Á Ströndinni, with the band Eik, 1977
 Í Ræktinni, with the band Kan, 1984
 Dawn of the Human Revolution, the album containing the hit "Can‘t Walk Away", 1985
 Transmit, a 12" record, 1986
 Time Flies, 1987
 Being Human, 1993
 Dawn of the Human Revolution, republished on CD, 1996
 Ný Spor Á Íslenskri Tungu, 2001
 Spegill Sálarinnar – Open Your Eyes, 2008
 Tree Of Life, 2011
 Nýtt Upphaf, 2012
 Flakkað um ferilinn, 2015
 Starbright, 2018

Compilation albums
FAITH – all the best known songs of Herbert with four new ones 1998
 Flakkað um Ferilinn, 2013

DVD releases
Concert at the Icelandic Opera, 2010
 DVD Can't Walk Away documentary about the career of Herbert Guðmundsson, 2017

Herbert on Youtube
 Twenty One – a song written by Herbert performed with Eik
One of the first songs written by Herbert – Twenty One
 Can't Walk Away – Herbert's first mega hit in Iceland
     CAN'T WALK AWAY
 Hollywood – Herbert wrote this song and then went to Los Angeles to shoot a music video.
     
 Time – A song Herbert wrote with his son
      TIME
 Camilia – a cover made by Herbert of a Swedish song
    Camilia
 Magic Feeling – Herbert put on the spot in an Icelandic TV program
   Magic Feeling

References

External links
 Official website

1953 births
Living people
Herbert Gudmundsson
Herbert Gudmundsson
Herbert Gudmundsson
Herbert Gudmundsson